United States v. Moalin is a court case that was heard and decided by the United States Court of Appeals for the Ninth Circuit. It was an appeal by four Somali individuals who had been convicted based on data obtained through bulk telephone data collection by the National Security Agency. The appeals court upheld their convictions, but also ruled that bulk telephone data collection by the National Security Agency, the details of which were leaked by Edward Snowden, were illegal.

The case proceeded slowly because of classified data, taking seven years.

On September 2, 2020, a unanimous decision by the three-judge panel was published. They ruled that bulk collection of telephone data was illegal because it violated the Foreign Intelligence Surveillance Act. They also ruled that it was possibly unconstitutional.

However, this decision may not have had a major effect, because the bulk telephone data collection program involved in the case ended in 2015, and the program that replaced it was also shut down.

See also 

 Mass surveillance in the United States

References 

United States Court of Appeals for the Ninth Circuit cases
Mass surveillance litigation
2020 in United States case law
United States privacy case law
Privacy of telecommunications
National Security Agency